Cédric Claude André Sansot, also written as Cédrick (born 13 April 1989) is a New Caledonian footballer who plays as a midfielder for Hienghène Sport in the New Caledonia Super Ligue.

References

1989 births
Living people
New Caledonian footballers
AS Magenta players
Hienghène Sport players
Association football midfielders
New Caledonia international footballers
2016 OFC Nations Cup players